This is a list of the bird and mammal species and subspecies described as endangered by the United States Fish and Wildlife Service. It contains species and subspecies not only in the U.S. and its territories, but also those only found in other parts of the world. It does not include endangered fish, amphibians, reptiles, plants, or invertebrates. The complete list can be found in the U.S. Code of Federal Regulations Title 50 Part 17.

The listings for status are E for endangered or T for threatened. Species or subspecies may also be endangered or threatened because they are sufficiently similar in appearance to endangered or threatened species or subspecies and are marked for "similarity of appearance" as E(S/A) or T(S/A).

Threatened species are animals and plants that are likely to become endangered in the foreseeable future.

Identifying, protecting, and restoring endangered and threatened species and subspecies are the primary objectives of the U.S. Fish and Wildlife Service's endangered species program.



Mammals

Birds

References
This article incorporates public domain text (a public domain work of the United States Government) from reference.

External links
U.S. Fish & Wildlife Service Endangered Species website

01
Endangered
.
Endangered
United States
E
United States Fish and Wildlife Service list